In applied mathematics, the Biot–Tolstoy–Medwin (BTM) diffraction model describes edge diffraction.  Unlike the uniform theory of diffraction (UTD), BTM does not make the high frequency assumption (in which edge lengths and distances from source and receiver are much larger than the wavelength). BTM sees use in acoustic simulations.

Impulse response 

The impulse response according to BTM is given as follows:

The general expression for sound pressure is given by the convolution integral

 

where  represents the source signal, and  represents the impulse response at the receiver position. The BTM gives the latter in terms of

 the receiver position 
 the (outer) wedge angle  and from this the wedge index 
 the speed of sound 

as an integral over edge positions 

 

 

where

See also 
 Uniform theory of diffraction

Notes

References 
 Calamia, Paul T. and Svensson, U. Peter, "Fast time-domain edge-diffraction calculations for interactive acoustic simulations," EURASIP Journal on Advances in Signal Processing, Volume 2007, Article ID 63560.

Signal processing